Horst Skoff was the defending champion but lost in the second round to Glenn Layendecker.

Paul Annacone won in the final 6–7, 6–4, 6–1, 2–6, 6–3 against Kelly Evernden.

Seeds

  Jay Berger (quarterfinals)
  Thomas Muster (semifinals)
  Horst Skoff (second round)
  Paolo Canè (second round)
  Goran Prpić (second round)
  Jordi Arrese (first round)
  Anders Järryd (quarterfinals)
  Goran Ivanišević (first round)

Draw

Final

Section 1

Section 2

External links
 ATP singles draw

Singles